Mihaela Buzărnescu was the defending champion, but chose not to participate.

Olga Danilović won the title, defeating Laura Siegemund in the final, 5–7, 6–1, 6–3.

Seeds

Draw

Finals

Top half

Bottom half

References
Main Draw

Reinert Open - Singles
Reinert Open